Poulton Priory or the Priory of St Mary was a Gilbertine priory in Poulton, Gloucestershire, England. It was founded as a chantry chapel in 1337 by Sir Thomas Seymour and became a house of Gilbertine canons in 1350. From 1539, with the Dissolution of the Monasteries, the priory was used as the parish church for Poulton. It was demolished in 1873.

A Tudor style mansion was built on the site by Sir Arthur Blomfield for the Marshall family c. 1897. It was later owned by James Joicey and Major Alexander Black-Mitchell. In World War II, it was used as a children's hospital.

References

Bibliography

Gilbertine monasteries
Monasteries in Gloucestershire
1350 establishments in England
Christian monasteries established in the 14th century
1539 disestablishments in England